Pretty Girl is the second extended play by South Korean girl group Kara. It was released on December 4, 2008. A song with the same name was released as the title track to promote the album.

History
It was announced in late November that Kara would be releasing a second mini-album, two months after "Rock U", with a fun "party" concept.<ref name="Maeil">[http://news.mk.co.kr/newsRead.php?sc=30000023&cm=%EB%AC%B8%ED%99%94%C2%B7%EC%97%B0%EC%98%88%20%EC%A3%BC%EC%9A%94%EA%B8%B0%EC%82%AC&year=2008&no=735645&selFlag=&relatedcode=&wonNo=&sID=300 카라, '프리티 걸' 뮤비 공개...미니 2집 활동 본격 돌입 예고 Kara, "Pretty Girl" MV Released...2nd Mini Album Activities Rush-Announced] . 매일경제 (Maeil Gyeongjae). December 2, 2008. Retrieved December 3, 2008.</ref>  After the song's release and the positive reception that it received the group's name became a popular search term on various Korean portal sites propelling the girls' popularity in South Korea.

In addition, the song also charted high on various websites and digital music retailers, which allowed the group to rival some of South Korea's top girl groups such as Wonder Girls, Girls' Generation, and the Brown Eyed Girls.  The group's leader, Park Gyu-ri, attributed Kara's rise in popularity to their natural but pretty appeal, while national newspaper Sports Seoul attributed it to the fact that the band finally found their own identity.

Promotion
The group began its comeback on all major music shows on December 4, 2008, the single's release date, starting with M.Net Countdown.  During their first national performance on KBS's Music Bank, member Goo Ha Ra forgot part of the choreography and cried for an hour backstage.

During Kara's December 14, 2008 performance on Seoul Broadcasting System's Inkigayo ("Popular Songs"), the fans decided to cheer with pink rubber gloves, which positively surprised viewers; even the group was surprised, as member Han Seung-yeon wrote on her blog that she almost died of laughter.Kim, Sung-han. 카라 "어? 고무장갑 부대… 웃겨 죽을뻔" (Kara: "Huh? The Rubber Glove Accessories...I Almost Died Laughing"). Sports Hankook. December 15, 2008. Retrieved December 2008.

"Pretty Girl" is featured in the international arcade music game, DJ Max Technika 3''.

Music video
On November 29, 2008, DSP Entertainment released a teaser video for "Pretty Girl", which received over 40,000 hits in one day.  The full video was released on December 2, 2008 online and was positively received by the public.

Chart performance 
The Gaon Music Chart was launched in February 2010 as the official chart for South Korea. The album entered at number 76 on the Gaon Album Chart for the second week of 2010 and peaked at number 23 for the week ending November 27, 2010.

Track listing

Charts

Weekly charts

References

2008 EPs
Kara (South Korean group) EPs
Korean-language EPs